Oberoi (also spelled as Uberoi, Oberai and Obhrai) is a surname originating among the Punjabi Khatri caste of northern India.

Notable people
Akshay Oberoi (born 1985), American-born Hindi film actor of Punjabi origin, nephew of Suresh Oberoi 
Harjot Oberoi, Sikh scholar
Karan Oberoi, Indian television actor, anchor and singer
Karan Oberoi (model) (born 1987), Indian fitness and fashion model
Kavita Oberoi OBE (born 1970), British entrepreneur
Mohan Singh Oberoi (1898–2002), founder of Oberoi hotel chain
Neha Oberoi, Indian actress who has acted in Tollywood and Bollywood films
Ojaswi Oberoi, now called Ojaswi Aroraa, Indian television actress
Praveen Oberoi (born 1953), Indian cricketer
Prinal Oberoi, Indian actress who primarily works in Hindi serials
Prithvi Raj Singh Oberoi (born 1929), the Executive Chairman of EIH Limited
Ranki Oberoi, Dutch Paralympic athlete
RJ Disha Oberoi, known as RJ Disha, Indian radio Jockey
Salil Oberoi (born 1983), Indian cricketer
Shivaleeka Oberoi (born 1996), Indian actress predominantly working in the Hindi film industry
Suresh Oberoi (born 1946), Indian character actor
Vinay Sheel Oberoi (born 1957), IAS Officer
Viresh Oberoi (born 1956), Indian businessman
Vivek Oberoi (born 1976), Indian film actor, son of Suresh Oberoi

See also
 List of Khatris
 List of Khatri surnames on Wiktionary''

References

Indian surnames
Khatri clans
Punjabi tribes
Punjabi-language surnames
Khatri surnames
Surnames of Indian origin
Hindu surnames